Hybrid birds of paradise may occur when individuals of different species, that look similar and have overlapping ranges, confuse each other for their own species and crossbreed.

Erwin Stresemann hypothesised that hybridisation among birds-of-paradise might explain why so many of the described species were so rare. Stresemann examinined many controversial specimens and, during the 1920s and 1930s, he published several papers on his hypothesis. Many of the species described in the late 19th and early 20th centuries are now generally considered to be hybrids, though some are still subject to dispute; their status is unlikely to be settled definitely without genetic examination of museum specimens.

Known or presumptive hybrids 

Some named hybrids and presumed hybrids are:

 Astrapian sicklebill (Astrapia nigra x Epimachus f. fastosus). Originally described as species Epimachus astrapioides Rothschild, 1897.
 Barnes's astrapia (Astrapia mayeri x A. stephaniae). Originally described as species Astrarchia barnesi Iredale, 1948.
 Bensbach's bird-of-paradise (presumed Lophorina m. magnificus x Paradisaea m. minor). Originally described as species Janthothorax bensbachi Büttikofer, 1894.
 Blood's bird-of-paradise (Paradisaea raggiana salvadorii x P. rudolphi margaritae). Originally described as species Paradisaea bloodi Iredale, 1948.
 Duivenbode's bird-of-paradise (Paradisaea guilielmi x P. minor finschi). Originally described as species Paradisaea duivenbodei Ménégaux, 1913.
 Duivenbode's riflebird (Ptiloris magnificus x Lophorina minor). Originally described as species Paryphephorus (Craspediphora) duivenbodei Meyer, 1890.
 Duivenbode's six-wired bird-of-paradise (presumed Parotia sefilata x Lophorina superba). Originally described as species Parotia duivenbodei Rothschild, 1900.
 Elliot's bird-of-paradise (presumed Astrapia nigra x Epimachus f. fastosus). Originally described as species Epimachus ellioti Ward, 1873.
 False-lobed astrapia (Paradigalla carunculata x Epimachus f. fastosus). Originally described as species Pseudastrapia lobata Rothschild, 1907.
 Gilliard's bird-of-paradise (Paradisaea raggiana salvadorii x P. minor finschi).
 King of Holland's bird-of-paradise (Cicinnurus magnificus x C. regius). Originally described as species Diphyllodes gulielmi III Meyer, 1875.
 Lupton's bird-of-paradise (Paradisaea raggiana salvadorii x P. apoda novaeguineae). Originally described as subspecies Paradisaea apoda luptoni Lowe, 1923.
 Lyre-tailed king bird-of-paradise (Cicinnurus magnificus x C. regius). Originally described as species Cicinnurus lyogyrus Currie, 1900.
 Mantou's riflebird (presumed Lophorina magnificus x Seleucidis melanoleucus). Originally described as Craspedophora mantoui Oustalet, 1891.
 Maria's bird-of-paradise (presumed Paradisaea guilielmi x P. raggiana augustaevictoriae). Originally described as species Paradisaea maria Reichenow, 1894.
 Mysterious bird of Bobairo (presumed Epimachus fastosus atratus x Lophorina superba feminina).
 Rothschild's bird-of-paradise (Paradisaea raggiana augustaevictoriae x P. minor finschi). Originally described as species Paradisaea mixta Rothschild, 1921.
 Rothschild's lobe-billed bird-of-paradise (presumed Paradigalla carunculata x Lophorina s. superba). Originally described as species Loborhamphus nobilis Rothschild, 1901.
 Ruys's bird-of-paradise (Cicinnurus m. magnificus x Paradisaea m. minor). Originally described as species NeoParadisaea ruysi van Oort, 1906.
 Schodde's bird-of-paradise (Paradisornis rudolphi margaritae x Parotia l. lawesii).
 Sharpe's lobe-billed parotia (presumed Parotia sefilata x Paradigalla carunculata). Originally described as species Loborhamphus ptilorhis Sharpe, 1908.
 Stresemann's bird-of-paradise (Lophorina superba x Parotia carolae). Originally described as subspecies Lophorina superba pseudoparotia Stresemann, 1934.
 Wilhelmina's bird-of-paradise (presumed Lophorina superba x Cicinnurus magnificus). Originally described as species Lamprothorax wilhelminae Meyer, 1894.
 Wonderful bird-of-paradise (Seleucidis melanoleucus x Paradisaea minor). Originally described as species Paradisaea mirabilis Reichenow, 1901.

Other possible hybrids

18th century French artist Jacques Barraband, known for his ability to illustrate birds with a high degree of accuracy, produced a few illustrations of unidentified birds-of-paradise. It has been postulated that these paintings may be simply inaccurate, depict undescribed species, or depict hybrids that have not since been observed.

On 15 May 2004, New Scientist published one of these paintings, which depicts a bird that most closely resembles the twelve-wired bird-of-paradise, although there are several obvious differences.

References

Paradisaeidae
Intergeneric hybrids
Hybrid birds-of-paradise